The 2014 Sunshine Tour was the 15th season of professional golf tournaments since the southern Africa based Sunshine Tour was relaunched in 2000, and the 8th since the tour switched a calendar based season in 2007. The Sunshine Tour represents the highest level of competition for male professional golfers in the region.

The tour is based predominantly in South Africa with other events being held in neighbouring countries, including Zimbabwe, Swaziland, Zambia and Namibia.

As usual, the tour consists of two distinct parts, commonly referred to as the "Summer Swing" and the "Winter Swing". Tournaments held during the Summer Swing generally have much higher prize funds, attract stronger fields, and until 2012 were the only tournaments on the tour to carry world ranking points, with some events being co-sanctioned with the European Tour. Since the tour switched to a calendar based season, this part of the tour has been split in two, with some events being held at the start of the year, and the remainder in November and December.

The OWGR board announced adjustments to the points distribution starting in September 2014 and some events would get higher values of 7–11 points depending on strength of field. The first event under the new system was the Wild Coast leg of the Vodacom Origins of Golf, which received seven OWGR points.

Schedule
The following table lists official events during the 2014 season.

Order of Merit
The Order of Merit was based on prize money won during the season, calculated in South African rand.

Branden Grace (3.8 million), Ross Fisher (3.7 million), Louis Oosthuizen (2.7 million), and Andy Sullivan (2.4 million) did not play the minimum number of tournaments required (seven) to be ranked.

Notes

References

External links

Sunshine Tour
Sunshine Tour